Jessica Zafra (born 1965) is a fiction writer, columnist, editor, publisher, and former television and radio show host. She is known for her sharp and witty writing style. Her work often are about current events (both Philippine and international), tennis, movies, music, cats, books, technology, and her personal life. Her work has been the subject of academic study. The main ingredient to her work is often fun cynicism and irony.

Biography
Zafra attended Saint Theresa's College of Quezon City, Quezon City, from prep school until the 6th Grade, after which she went to the main campus of the Philippine Science High School and then to the University of the Philippines where she majored in comparative literature.

Her most popular books are the Twisted series, a collection of her essays as a columnist for the newspaper Today (now Manila Standard Today), as well as from her time as editor and publisher of the magazine Flip. She currently writes a weekly column for InterAksyon.com, the online news portal of TV5. She resides in Metro Manila, Philippines, where she is working on her first novel. She also managed the Eraserheads during the 1990s.

Selected publications

Books
 500 People You Meet in Hell
 Manananggal Terrorizes Manila and Other Short Stories, 1992
 Womenagerie and Other Tales from the Front, 1995
 Twisted, 1995
 Twisted II: Spawn of Twisted, 1996
 Fruitcake, 1997 (as editor)
 Planet of the Twisted, 1998
 Chicken Pox for the Soul, 1999
 Twisted IV
 Twisted V
 Twisted 6
 Tw7sted
 Twisted 8: Night of the Living Twisted
 Twisted Flicks, 2007
 Twisted Travels
Twisted 8½
Twisted 9
The word-eaters
Jocks vs Geeks,  2014
 The Collected Stories of Jessica Zafra, 2019
 The Age of Umbrage, 2020

Magazines
 Manila Envelope
 Flip (as Editor-in-Chief

Filmography

Television
 Points of View, Studio 23

Other works

CDs
 Twisted's Greatest Hits'

Radio shows
 Twisted on a Sunday'', 103.5 K-Lite FM

Awards
 1991 Palanca Award, 1st Place, Short Story Category for "Portents"
 1993 Palanca Award, 3rd Place, Short Story Category for "Bad Boy, Robin, Baad, Baad Boy"
 1994 Palanca Award, 3rd Place, Short Story Category for "Black"

References

External links
 JessicaRulesTheUniverse.com
 Jessica Zafra podcast
 Jessica Zafra podcasts, 2012-present
 Interaksyon.com article

1965 births
Living people
Filipino women writers
Filipino columnists
Filipino women columnists